Gyamfi is a Ghanaian name that may refer to the following notable people:
Given name
Gyamfi Kyeremeh (born 1995), Belgian football winger

Surname
Bright Gyamfi (born 1996), Ghanaian football defender
Charles Gyamfi (born 1929), Ghanaian footballer and manager
Emmanuel Gyamfi (born 1994), Ghanaian football winger 
Emmanuel Akwasi Gyamfi, Ghanaian politician
Frank Sarfo-Gyamfi (born 1994), Ghanaian football winger
Isaac Gyamfi (born 2000), Ghanaian football midfielder
Maxwell Gyamfi (born 2000), German football defender
Mercy Adu-Gyamfi (born 1971), Ghanaian politician
Poku Adu-Gyamfi, Ghanaian politician
Saarrah Adu-Gyamfi, Ghanaian politician
Sammy Gyamfi (born 1989), Ghanaian lawyer and politician
Samuel Adu Gyamfi, Ghanaian politician and an educationalist
Sarfo Gyamfi (born 1967), Ghanaian football player

See also
Adu Gyamfi Senior High School 

Surnames of Akan origin